Jaako may refer to:

 Jaako people, an ethnic group of Australia
 Jaako language, an Australian language
 Joni Jaako, Swedish athlete

See also 
 Jaakko, a Finish given name (including a list of people with the name)
 Jako (disambiguation)